Procerobatrachus is an extinct genus of prehistoric amphibian. It was described based on material from Uzbekistan.

See also
 Prehistoric amphibian
 List of prehistoric amphibians

References

Cretaceous frogs
Late Cretaceous amphibians
Fossils of Uzbekistan
Fossil taxa described in 1993